Alternative Party may refer to:

Alternative Party (demo party), a demo art party
Alternative Party (Armenia), a political party
Alternative Party (Turkey), a political party

See also